The Tamil Nadu Legislative Council was the upper house of the legislature of the Indian state of Tamil Nadu. It is a Vidhan Parishad and its members are chosen by a mixture of direct and indirect elections and nominations by the Governor of Tamil Nadu. The council was abolished in 1986 and was revived in 2010 by an act of parliament. The council is a permanent body and is not subject to dissolution. The length of a member's term is six years and one third of the members retired every two years. The strength of the council is between 40 and 78 (one third of the strength of the assembly).

Methods of member selection
The following table illustrates how the members of Council were selected:

List of constituencies
Constituencies for the new council were identified in September 2010:

Local body constituencies

Graduates' constituencies

Teachers' constituencies

References

Tamil Nadu Legislative Council
tamil Nadu
Legislative Council constituencies